Durga Das Boro   is an Indian politician member of  Bodoland People's Front from Assam.  He is an MLA, elected from the  Kalaigaon constituency in the 2021 Assam Legislative Assembly election .

References 

Living people
People from Udalguri district

Year of birth missing (living people)